Martin Donnelly (born 28 August 1988) is a retired Northern Irish footballer born in Belfast who played as a winger.

After previously playing for Sheffield United and Rochdale, without appearing in the Football League, Donnelly signed for Crusaders in the summer of 2008, and won the Irish Cup in 2009. Along with team-mate Colin Coates, he was called up to the Northern Ireland squad for the match against Italy on 6 June 2009. Donnelly entered the game as an 82nd-minute substitute to win his first full cap, to add to the three under-21 caps he had won previously.

During his time with the Crues, he made a total of 126 appearances, scoring 22 goals. After turning down the club's offer of a new contract midway through the 2010–11 season, Donnelly joined North Belfast rivals Cliftonville on a two-year contract, of whom he is a lifelong fan.

Donnelly joined Larne in the 2018 transfer window and quickly established himself as a firm fans favourite. He scored 24 goals as the club romped to the 2018/19 Championship title. On 16 August 2021 it was announced that Donnelly had signed for Linfield, as part of a player exchange deal which saw Navid Nasseri move to Larne.

Honours
Crusaders
Irish Cup (1): 2008–09
County Antrim Shield (1): 2009–10

Cliftonville
County Antrim Shield (1): 2011–12
NIFL Premiership (2): 2012–13, 2013–14
Irish League Cup (4): 2012–13, 2013–14, 2014–15, 2015–16

Larne
County Antrim Shield (1): 2020-21
NIFL Championship (1): 2018-19

Individual
Ulster Young Player of the Year (1): 2008–09
NIFL Championship Player of the Year 2018-19
NIFL Championship Team of the Year 2018-19
NIFL Premiership Team of the Year 2020-21

References

External links
Northern Ireland profile at NIFG

1988 births
Living people
Association footballers from Belfast
Association footballers from Northern Ireland
Northern Ireland international footballers
Northern Ireland under-21 international footballers
Association football midfielders
Sheffield United F.C. players
Rochdale A.F.C. players
Crusaders F.C. players
NIFL Premiership players
Cliftonville F.C. players
Larne F.C. players